is a junction railway station in the city of Nan'yō, Yamagata Prefecture, Japan., operated by the East Japan Railway Company (JR East), with the Yamagata Railway Company as a tenant.

Lines
Akayu Station is served by the Ōu Main Line and the Yamagata Shinkansen, and is located 56.1 rail kilometers from the terminus of both lines at Fukushima Station and 328.9 kilometers from Tokyo Station. It is also the terminus of the Yamagata Railway Flower Nagai Line and is located 30.5 kilometers from the opposing terminal of the line a

Station layout
The station has one side platform and one island platform connected to the station building by a footbridge. The station has a Midori no Madoguchi staffed ticket office.

Platforms

History
Akayu Station opened on 21 April 1900. The Yamagata Railway connected to the station on 26 October 1913. The station was absorbed into the JR East network upon the privatization of JNR on 1 April 1987.

Passenger statistics
In fiscal 2018, the JR portion of the station was used by an average of 1322 passengers daily (boarding passengers only).

Surrounding area
 Akayu Hot Springs

See also
 List of railway stations in Japan

References

External links

 JR East station information 

Railway stations in Japan opened in 1900
Railway stations in Yamagata Prefecture
Yamagata Shinkansen
Ōu Main Line
Yamagata Railway Flower Nagai Line
Stations of East Japan Railway Company
Nan'yō, Yamagata